The Cody Floatplane (also referred to as the Cody Hydro-biplane) was designed and built by Samuel Franklin Cody as an entrant in the 1913 Daily Mail Circuit of Britain race, which offered a prize of £5,000. On 7 August 1913  the aircraft suffered a structural failure during flight trials and both Cody and his passenger were killed.

Design and development
The Cody Floatplane was a three-bay biplane of orthodox design for an aircraft of its time, with a single elevator operated by a bamboo push-rod mounted on booms in front of the wing and a single rudder and small horizontal stabiliser on booms behind it. Lateral control was effected by wing-warping. Power was provided by a  Green engine mounted on the wing centre section driving a  diameter Garuda propeller via a chain. Pilot and passenger were seated in tandem in front of the wing, using Cody's preferred metal seats, of the type used on agricultural machinery. The arrangement of the controls was unconventional by present-day standards: all the control surfaces were operated by a control column and wheel, and the throttle and engine ignition were controlled using foot pedals. It was fitted with one large central float with three steps and a pair of smaller stabilising floats positioned below the inboard interplane struts.

The machine was completed in July 1913, and made its maiden flight as a landplane on 14 July 1913. It was fitted with its floats and carried out flotation tests on the Basingstoke Canal at Mytchett on 30 July. The floats were then removed and replaced again by skids and wheels for more flight trials. Early on the morning of 7 August Cody carried out a 70-mile (113 km) test flight, with the plan of flying down to Calshot, Southampton, where the aircraft would be fitted with its floats to carry out test flights from water.  He agreed, however, to give a flight to the  Hampshire cricketer William Evans and took off at 10:30 am with Evans as a passenger. After about eight minutes the aircraft broke up in the air at a height of about 200 ft (60 m) with Cody and Evans, who were not strapped in, being thrown out of the aircraft. Both were killed. The Royal Aero Club accident investigation concluded that the accident was due to "inherent structural weakness", and suggested that Cody and Evans might have survived the crash if strapped in.

Specifications

Notes

Bibliography

 

Floatplane
Biplanes
Single-engined pusher aircraft
1910s British experimental aircraft
Aviation accidents and incidents in 1913
1913 in England
Aviation accidents and incidents in England
Aircraft first flown in 1913